Justice Dickinson may refer to:

Daniel A. Dickinson (1839–1902), associate justice of the Minnesota Supreme Court
Jess H. Dickinson (born 1947), associate justice of the Mississippi Supreme Court
Townsend Dickinson (1795–1851), associate justice of the Arkansas Supreme Court

See also
Edwin C. Dickenson (1880–1956), associate justice of the Connecticut Supreme Court
Justice Dickerson (disambiguation)